Moroishta is a village in Municipality of Struga, North Macedonia.

The village was first mentioned in 1345 in the letter of the Serbian king Stefan Dusan as Moroviste.

Demographics
By the statistic of 1900 in Moroista (Мороишта) lived 250 people, and they were all Macedonians (Македонци).

According to the 2002 census, the village had a total of 909 inhabitants. Ethnic groups in the village include:

Macedonians 903
Serbs 4
Aromanians 2

References

Villages in Struga Municipality